Washi is a type of paper made in Japan. 

Washi may also refer to:

Sidiga Washi, Sudanese academic specialising in population, reproductive health and nutrition
Washi Tahsil, a tahsil or subdistrict in Maharashtra, India
Washi, Osmanabad, a village
9063 Washi, a main-belt asteroid
Washi Dam, a dam in Ōno, Fukui, Japan
Washi, an informal first-person Japanese pronoun
Washi (hill), a Welsh mountain category

See also
Vashi (disambiguation)
List of tropical storms named Washi